Taixing is a county-level city under the administration of Taizhou, Jiangsu province, China. It is located in the Yangtze River Delta, bordering the prefecture-level cities of Nantong to the east, Changzhou to the southwest, and Zhenjiang to the west.

History 
The southern Hailin county was taken away to create Taixing in 938, it was administrated by Taizhou. It was under the jurisdiction of Yangzhou during the era of Yuan and Ming, but was transferred to Tongzhou later. It was returned to Yangzhou in 1953, and became a county-level city in 1992. It was transferred to Taizhou in 1996.

Administrative divisions
In the present, Taixing City has 1 subdistrict, 14 towns and 1 township.
1 subdistrict
 Jichuan

14 towns

1 township
 Gensi

Climate

Notable people
 Ding Wenjiang (Geologist)
 Gao Hong (soccer player)
 Lu Wenfu (Writer)
 Wang Xiyu (tennis player)
 Yang Gensi (Soldier and war hero)
 Luna Yin (Singer)
 Huang Ming (Entrepreneur)

See also
 Zhong'anlun Monument, to the victims of a ferry disaster

References

External links 

 Taixing City English Guide (Jiangsu.net)

Cities in Jiangsu
Taizhou, Jiangsu